The 11th Guards Air Assault Brigade (Russian: 11-я отдельная гвардейская десантно-штурмовая бригада) is an airborne brigade of the Russian Airborne Troops, currently based at Sosnovy Bor near Ulan Ude in Buryatia. The brigade was first formed in 1968 as the 11th Separate Air Assault Brigade and two of its helicopter regiments fought in the Soviet–Afghan War. The brigade formed in 1968 at Mogocha as the 11th Separate Airborne Brigade. In 1971 it became the 11th Air Assault Brigade. In 1988, the brigade became an airborne brigade again.  It moved to Ulan Ude in May 1993. The brigade became an air assault brigade in 1998. The brigade received the Guards title in 2015.

History 
The brigade was formed as the 11th Separate Airborne Brigade on 1 August 1968 in Mogocha. Along with the 13th Separate Airborne Brigade, it was the first of many Soviet air assault brigades formed in the Cold War. It was formed from the 1st Battalion of the 113th Guards Motorized Rifle Regiment of the 38th Guards Motor Rifle Division, which was renamed the 617th Separate Airborne Assault Battalion. The 696th Helicopter Regiment, 656th Separate Communications Company and the 49th Separate Airfield Technical Support company combined to form the 211th Aviation Group. The 618th and 619th Separate Airborne Assault battalions were formed from two battalions of the 52nd Motorized Rifle Division in Nizhneudinsk. The 284th Independent Artillery Battalion was formed in Mogocha during the same month. The 617th, 618th and 619th Separate Airborne Assault Battalions (OVSHB) became air assault battalions (ODSHB) in April 1969. In July 1971, it was renamed the 11th Landing-Assault Brigade (air assault; ODShBr).

Between 1981 and 1987, crews from the brigade's 307th and 329th Helicopter Regiments participated in the Soviet–Afghan War attached to the 280th Separate Helicopter Regiment on a one-year rotational basis. On 8 December 1987, the brigade was awarded the Ministry of Defence pennant "for courage and valor" for its performance during exercises in the Arctic. By a directive of the Soviet defense ministry, the brigade became the 11th Separate Airborne Brigade and its battalions were renumbered as the 1st, 2nd and 3rd Line Paratroop Battalions (PDB) in 1988. In May 1993, the brigade was relocated to Ulan-Ude. The brigade formed the 226th Separate Squadron Military Transport Aviation in December 1994. The 80th Independent Tank Battalion was added to the brigade and the 1st and 2nd Line Paratroop Battalions became the 498th and 499th Separate Airborne Battalions equipped with BMP-2 infantry fighting vehicles in July 1995. The 712th Guards Howitzer Artillery Battalion also became part of the brigade during this period. In February 1996, the 500th Separate Airborne Battalion was formed from the 3rd Line Paratroop Battalion. The 226th Separate Squadron Military Transport Aviation was disbanded in December, and the 80th Independent Tank Battalion in August 1997. On 1 May 1998, the brigade was again renamed the 11th Air Assault Brigade.

The brigade's 500th Separate Airborne Battalion was disbanded in 2006. During the Vostok-2010 exercises, the brigade showed military skill, for which it was awarded the pennant "for military valor" of the Ministry of Defence. During the same year, the brigade became part of the 36th Army. The brigade was presented with a new flag by Dmitry Medvedev on 24 August 2011. The brigade became part of the Russian Airborne Troops in December 2013. On 25 March 2015, the brigade was assigned the title 'Guards'.

In January 2022, elements of the brigade were reportedly deployed to Belarus in the context of the Ukraine crisis. The brigade was then employed in the subsequent invasion of Ukraine.

During the Russian invasion of Ukraine some members of the 11th Guards Air Assault Brigade –  Captain Mikhoyev and Corporal Kasatkin – were captured as Prisoners of War by the Ukrainian Defence Force. On March 7, the Ukrainian military claimed to have killed Lt. Col. Denis Glebov, deputy commander of the brigade, in action near Kharkiv.

Structure

Current 
The Russian air assault brigade currently consists of:
Brigade Headquarters
Airborne Battalion
1st Air Assault Battalion
2nd Air Assault Battalion
Howitzer Artillery Battalion (122mm D-30)
Anti-Aircraft Missile-Artillery Battery
Anti-Tank Missile Battery
Reconnaissance Battalion
Special Purpose Company
Rifle Company (Snipers)
Control Company
Engineering Company
Landing Support Company
NBC Defense Platoon
Maintenance Company
Material Support Company
Medical Company
Commandant's Platoon
Tank Company

Historical 
Battalions were renumbered in 1996, and from 1996–2006 the brigade included the 498th, 499th, and 500th Battalions. The 500th Battalion was disbanded in 2006.

 498th Separate Airborne Battalion
 499th Separate Airborne Battalion

Commanders 
 Colonel Yuriy Ivanovich Duk (1968 — 1972)
 Major General Valentin Aleksandrovich Shmelyov (1972 — 1979)
 Colonel Ivan Vasilyevich Kolesnikov (1979 — 1983)
 Colonel Albert Grigoryevich Bondar (1983 — 1986)
 Colonel Mukhamed Tuchevich Batyrov (1986 — 1989)
 Colonel  anatoliy Petrovich Kachanov (1989 — 1991)
 Colonel  Vyacheslav Nikolaevich Borisov (1991 — 1995)
 Colonel  Vasiliy Mikhailovich Malyk (1995 — 1998)
 Colonel  Vladimir Evgenyevich Voronkov (1998 — 2000)
 Colonel  Nikolai Nikolaevich Gordeyev (2000 — 2002)
 Colonel Andrey Evgenyevich Khoptyar (2002 — 2005)
 Colonel Vitaliy Aleksandrovich Bronyuk (2005 — 2012)
 Guards Colonel Mikhail Nikolaevich Ugolyov (2012 — 2013)
 Colonel Oleg Yuryevich Mityaev (2013 — 2015)
 Guards Colonel Ruslan Leontyevich Evkodimov (2015 — 2020)
 Guards Colonel Denis Shishov (2020 — 2022)

References

Citations

Bibliography 

Airborne infantry brigades of Russia
Military units and formations established in 1968
Military units and formations of the 2022 Russian invasion of Ukraine